Gusevsky (masculine), Gusevskaya (feminine), or Gusevskoye (neuter) is the name of several inhabited localities in Russia.

Urban localities
Gusevsky, Vladimir Oblast, a settlement under the administrative jurisdiction of the Town of Gus-Khrustalny in Vladimir Oblast

Rural localities
Gusevsky, Nizhny Novgorod Oblast, a pochinok in Akatovsky Selsoviet under the administrative jurisdiction of the town of oblast significance of Shakhunya in Nizhny Novgorod Oblast; 
Gusevsky, Tambov Oblast, a settlement in Nizhneshibryaysky Selsoviet of Uvarovsky District in Tambov Oblast
Gusevskaya, a village in Tarasovsky Selsoviet of Plesetsky District in Arkhangelsk Oblast